Seb Wileman (born 13 March 1993 in Australia) is an Australian rugby union player who plays for the Queensland Reds in Super Rugby. His playing position is centre. He was named in the Reds squad for week 12 in 2019.

PLAYING HISTORY

2019
Queensland Reds Super Rugby; 
QPR Brothers Rugby Club 

2018
NSW Country Eagles;
NRC Warringah Rats;
NSW Shute Shield Grand Finalists

2017
NSW Country Eagles;
NRC Warringah Rats;
NSW Shute Shield Champions

2016 
Sydney Rays;
NRC Warringah Rats;
NSW Shute Shield;
Shute Shield 'Rookie of the Year' Nominee

2015
Warringah Rats;
NSW Shute Shield

2014
Warringah Rats;
NSW Shute Shield

2013
Warringah Rats;
NSW Shute Shield

Junior Rugby
Wahroonga Tigers
Gordon Junior Representative Sides

Reference list

External links
Rugby.com.au profile
itsrugby.co.uk profile

1993 births
Australian rugby union players
Living people
Rugby union centres
Queensland Reds players